Enrico Magazzini (born 27 April 1988) is a former Italian cyclist.

Palmares
2005
1st stage 4 Giro della Lunigiana
2006
2nd Trofeo Dorigo Porte
3rd Tre Ciclistica Bresciana
2009
2nd Gran Premio Industrie del Marmo
3rd Trofeo Matteotti U23

References

1988 births
Living people
Italian male cyclists
People from Empoli
Sportspeople from the Metropolitan City of Florence
Cyclists from Tuscany